Argyresthia apicimaculella is a moth of the  family Yponomeutidae. It is found in North America, including Florida, Kentucky and Ohio.

The wingspan is about 10 mm. The forewings have a blackish or dark-brown, shining, almost triangular spot at the apex and three pale and indistinct brownish costal streaks before it. There is also a bright pale golden basal streak just within the costal margin.

Adults have been observed in oak woods in June and July. It is thought the larvae feed on Quercus species.

References

Moths described in 1874
Argyresthia
Moths of North America